Sunni and Shia are different sects among Muslims and the difference of opinions have resulted in many Fatwas, non-binding but authoritative legal opinion or learned interpretation issues pertaining to the Islamic law. Fatwas are based on the question and answer process found in the Quran, which seeks to enlighten on theological and philosophical issues, hadith, legal theory, duties, and the Sharia law. Sunni fatwas have been used to justify the persecution of Shia throughout their history.

Points of difference
While all Islamic schools and branches of Islam recognise the Qur'an, they differ in which other authorities they acknowledge; in particular the question of the Succession to Muhammad separates the Sunni, who acknowledge the elected Rashidun Caliphs and their descendants, from the Shia, who acknowledge the Imams or descendants of Prophet Muhammad; these two branches are then subdivided by their views on the further course of the succession. Shia fiqh differs with Sunni fiqh on not only political issues, but also important theological issues. Various attitudes towards Shias can be found among the worldwide majority Sunni community.

Opinions
The Sunni fatwas on Shias often involved legal opinions issued by an expert in the Sharia law. However, modern fatwas were also given by other Muslim authorities and these were recognized as long as they cite the legal sources used. Some of the notable fatwas are listed below:

Ottoman Empire

Ebussud Effendi 
Ottoman clergy officially maintained the pronunciation of Takfir on Twelver Sh'ism, a stance which was used by Ottoman sultans to declare the wars fought against the Safavid Empire as Jihad. The 16th century Ottoman Shaykhul Islam Ebussud Effendi issued a series of fatwas excommunicating Twelver Shi'ites as kuffar (disbelievers). He also proclaimed the legal verdict calling for the killing of the Kizilbash; which was implemented by Ottoman authorities to suppress Shi'ism throughout the empire. Declaring the Qizilbash as disbelievers and calling for their executions, Ebussud states: "These outrageous people became unbelievers as they scorned the Holy Qurʾan, the noble shariʿa, and the religion of Islam, disdained and killed scholars on account of their knowledge, [and] considered their immoral cursed leader god and prostrated before him. [They] considered permissible many religiously forbidden acts whose prohibition has been established by definite scriptural sources, and cursed Abu Bakr and ʿUmar (the first two caliphs after Muhammad’s death), may God be satisfied with them. In addition, they became unbelievers because they denied the Holy Qurʾan by defaming Aʿisha the trustworthy (Prophet’s wife), may God be pleased with her, who was exonerated by the revelation of several verses [in the Qurʾan]. By doing so, they also cursed the Prophet (hazret-i risalet-penah) and blemished his saintly personality. According to the consensus of a multitude of scholars from different times and places, killing them is permissible (mubah); those who doubt their unbelief become unbelievers.

Ibn Abidin 
However, major Sunni scholars have declared the unbelief of Shias who hold certain beliefs. For example, Ottoman scholar ibn Abidin, a source of authoritative fatwas for Hanafis writes:

Ahmad Raza
According to Imam Ahmad Raza, the founder of the Barelwi-movement, most Shiites of his day were apostates because they repudiated necessities of religion. This includes, according to him, the following:

Historical Fatwas 
Other Sunni scholars who have declared Shiites as deviants or apostates:

Imam Malik - One of his most prominent students, al-Buwayti, asked if it was permissible to pray behind a Rafidi to which Malik responded in the negative. Malik defined a Rafidi as “whoever says ‘Abu Bakr and `Umar are not Imams”.
Ibn Hazm — "Shia are not even Muslims", when Christians debating him brought a Shia book as reference.
Ibn Taymiya — He considered Shiites more heretical than Jews, Christians and many polytheists. Noting contemporary circumstances, he considered Shiites more harmful to the Muslim community than groups such as the Crusaders and Mongols.
Nizam al-Mulk — where he fully attacks the Rafida. However, there are reports that says that he and Malik Shah I after a debate between Sunni and Shi'a scholars which was prepared by him by the orders of Malik Shah I resulted in converting both him and the king to the Shi'a Islam. The story is reported by the son-in-law of Nizam al-Mulk, Mughatil ibn Bakri who attended the debate.
Manzur Nu'mani — issued a fatwa in December 1987 declaring Shia kuffar (non-believers), which was endorsed by hundreds of prominent Deobandi scholars in India and Pakistan.
Abd al-Aziz ibn Baz — Several of his fatwas denounced Shiites as atheists and apostates, and, among other rulings, forbade Sunni marriage to Shiites.
Yusuf al-Qaradawi — After saying he had previously been misguided to pursue Sunni-Shia rapprochement, Qaradawi went on to condemn Shiites as heretics in several fatwas and praised virulently anti-Shia Saudi Sunni clerics for being “more mature and far-sighted” than himself in generally judging Shias.
Ehsan Elahi Zaheer — Denounced the Shia as infidels and Zionist agents.
Abdul-Rahman al-Barrak — In a "vicious" fatwa against the Shia he concluded with: "the Sunni and Shia mathhabs (beliefs) are completely contradictory and cannot be reconciled; the talk of Sunni-Shia rapprochement is utterly false."
Abu Basir al-Tartusi — In his fatwa against Shia, he warned Muslims to "Interact with the Shii Rejectionists as you would with a person whose very existence is full of betrayal, treachery, fury and hatred against Islam and Muslims!"
Ali al-Khudair — In his Fatwa fi l-Shi'a, he says: "What we have today are the Rafidis [i.e., Twelvers], the Batini Isma'ilis, the Batini Nusayris, and the Batini Duruz. These four groups are the ones who deify the Al al-Bayt [i.e., the family and descendants of the Prophet Muhammed], they seek their intercession and are the worshippers of graves (quburiyyun). So these [people] are infidel polytheists (mushrikun kuffar) and are not Muslims. There is no difference [in status] between their scholars and followers (muqallidihim) or the ignorant among them (juhhalihim). They are all polytheists and are not Muslims and cannot be excused for their claim to be ignorant that they are worshipping other than God (la yu'dharan bi-l-jahl fi 'ibadati-him li-ghayr allah)."
Imam Ash-Sha'bi — "The Rafida are the Jews of this nation. They hate Islam as the Jews hate Christianity. They embraced Islam, not because they longed for it or because they feared Allah, but because they detested the Muslims and intended to overpower them."
Muhammad ibn Abd al-Wahhab — In one of his fatwas, he accused Shiites of shirk (polytheism) because of their cult of the saints, which included the adoration of figures such as Ali and Husayn and the veneration of tombs and shrines.
Shah Waliullah Dehlawi — He believed that the Shia interpretation and practices of Islam should be discarded, since they greatly misguide people.

There are Sunni fatwas that were considered Sunni obligation to the "insult offered to the Sunni faith by the Shia religious literature." This is demonstrated in the case of some Sunni fatwas issued in Pakistan, which were considered as defensive materials created for the purpose of defending the faith from the Shia. The latter's mere existence in the country within the context of these specific fatwas was considered as an insult.

Other opinions
In 1959, the Grand Imam of Al-Azhar Mahmood Shaltoot issued fatwa that Shia theology is a part of Islam. In 2016, the Grand Imam of Al-Azhar Ahmed el-Tayeb reissued Shaltoot's fatwa on Shia Muslims.

In 2004, both Sunni and Shia scholars released the so-called 2004 Amman Message, which established some form of standards to prevent or at least discredit and counter renegade interpretations such as those made by Osama bin Laden and Abu Bakr al-Baghdadi. This initiative outlined who are qualified to issue fatwas or legal opinions, promoting a more conservative framework over progressive interpretations. The Amman Message also asserted the common beliefs of the two Islamic sects.

Shaykh Faraz Rabbani has noted that it is not the way of Sunnis to make blanket takfir of Shias. He writes:

See also
 Criticism of Twelver Shia Islam
 Islamic schools and branches
 Schools of Islamic theology
 Shia Muslims in the Arab world
 Shia–Sunni relations

References

Shia–Sunni relations
Fatwas